Technology Will Save Us was a UK company that made DIY gadget kits. The company entered administraition on 17th March 2021. They have collaborated with the BBC on the Micro Bit

The company was founded in 2012 in London, England by Bethany Koby and Daniel Hirschmann, and went into Administration in March 2021.

Koby stated that the idea to start the company came after Koby and Hirschmann found a discarded laptop and were inspired to look at the modern consumer's relationship with technology.

References

Companies based in the London Borough of Tower Hamlets
Technology companies based in London